Robert J. Zydenbos (born 1957) is a Dutch-Canadian scholar who has doctorate degrees in Indian philosophy and Dravidian studies. He also has a doctorate of literature from the University of Utrecht in the Netherlands. Zydenbos also studied Indian religions and languages at the South Asia Institute and at the University of Heidelberg in Germany. He taught Sanskrit at the University of Heidelberg and later taught Jaina philosophy at the University of Madras in India. Zydenbos later taught Sanskrit, Buddhism, and South Asian religions at the University of Toronto in Canada. He was the first western scholar to write a doctoral thesis on contemporary Kannada fiction.

R. Zydenbos is a strong opponent to some writers, like Koenraad Elst or N. S. Rajaram, about the controversies pertaining to the Aryan Invasion Theory, which Zydenbos sees as driven by political motives. Zydenbos wrote review articles in the Journal of the American Oriental Society. Moreover, he has written the first comprehensive Western history of Kannada literature and translated Kannada literature into both German and English. He also translated Dvaitin, Virasaiva, and Jaina writings from Sanskrit. He has lived in Mysore, India for 17 years.

Books
Mokṣa in Jainism, according to Umāsvāti (Steiner, 1983)
The Calf Became an Orphan: A Study in Contemporary Kannada Fiction (Institut Français de Pondichéry, 1996)
Jainism Today and Its Future (Manya, 2006)

References

External links
Robert Zydenbos (Ludwig Maximilians University, Munich)
Journal of the American Oriental Society

1957 births
Living people
Canadian Indologists
Dutch Indologists
Religion academics
Philosophy academics
Academic staff of the Ludwig Maximilian University of Munich
Academic staff of the University of Toronto
Scholars of Jainism
Dutch Sanskrit scholars
Canadian expatriates in India

Utrecht University alumni
Linguists from Canada
Sanskrit scholars